Samoe Bolshoe Prostoe Chislo is a Russian indie group formed in 2006 by Kirill Ivanov and the duo EU.

History 
In 2006, the journalist Kirill Ivanov met with the duo EU and showed them his musical material (at the time labeled as post-hip-hop, anti-hip-hop, deconstructivist hip-hop), which he had worked on in his free time. Ivanov first performed his material as part of 2H Company, a side-project of EU. The first performance in Moscow took place at the Avant Festival in 2006. In August, Ivanov performed at Nashestvie, after which the decision was made to record the new project's debut album.

Initially, the group was known as 232,582,657 – 1, a representation of the largest known prime number at the time. The group adopted its current name, as new, larger prime numbers kept being discovered over time.

In 2007, the first album was finished and distributed through friends. The recording reached the famous musician and producer Oleg Nesterov, who officially released it on his label, Snegiri.

A few years into the formation Samoe Bolshoe Prostoe Chislo, Kirill Ivanov continued to work as a journalist and did stories for the programs Glavnyi Geroi on NTV and Bolshoi Gorod on STS. For a story on the Grushinsky festival for the latter program, Ivanov wrote a song that was performed at the festival by TV presenter Tatyana Arno with support from Aleksandr Zaitsev.

In 2008, the band members carried out the project SBPC-Orchestra along with some musician friends. An album of the same name was recorded, with the participation of 17 different musicians, from Stas Baretsky to Larik Surapov, ObschezhitiE, and Klever.

In the spring of 2009, the group returned to its status as a trio. SPBC moved away from its original genre, IDM: Ilya Baramiya took up the bass guitar, while Aleksandr Zaitsev became the guitarist and secondary vocalist, on equal footing with Ivanov. Some of the new material was performed at concerts and released as singles, but the group's third album was not released until November 12, 2011. After that, the group endeavored to release albums on an annual basis, and Kirill Ivanov stopped working as a journalist, instead spending most of his time on the creative process.

In 2012, the group released the album Lesnoi Orakul, which was inspired by summertime sensations, especially stays at the children's camp "Kamchatka", where Kirill Ivanov had worked as a counselor from time to time. They also filmed a music video for the song "Idealnoe Mesto", the lead single from the album. The drummer Aleksandra Zakharchenko participated in the recording of the album.

The split album SPBC and Cassiopeia Sing Each Other's Songs was released in 2013 in a limited edition on red vinyl. It is the last recording to feature Alexander Zaitsev. After this, the group consisted for some time of Kirill Ivanov and Ilya Baramiya, who occasionally brought outside singers and musicians into their creative process.

On March 3, 2014, the album Ya dumayu, dlya etovo ne pridumali slovo was released. The musician Igor Vdovin and singer Nadya Gritskevich were brought in for the recording of the album.

On May 19, 2015, the album Zdes' i vsegda was released. During the recording, SPBC was regularly joined by members of Tantsy Minus, guitarist Anton Khabibullin, and drummer Oleg Zanin.

In September 2016, the group released the album My - ogromnoe zhivotnoe, i my vas vsekh s'edim!, which was rated 7.5/10 by Afisha. A large-scale concert performance of the album took place in November in the Moscow venue Izvestiya Hall.

In 2017, "Vybroshu golovu - pust' dumaet serdtse!" was released on the Internet, and the group appeared in the Russian film About Love. For Adults Only, performing the song "Tam".

In the spring of 2018, the group released the album My ne spali, my snilis''', in which singer and actress Zhenya Borzykh appeared as a full-fledged member of the group. In addition, the album featured Nadia Gritskevich, Thomas Mraz, and the Children's Television and Radio Choir of St. Petersburg. The album was produced by Aleksandr Lipsky, former keyboard player of the band Pompeya.

After recording this latest album, Ilya Baramiya left the band to focus on his activities in the hip-hop duo AIGEL. He was replaced by Stanislav Astakhov.

Samoe Bolshoe Prostoe Chislo continues to work on new music and performs in cities in Russia and abroad. Kirill Ivanov also owns three venues in St. Petersburg: Mishka,  Obshchestvo Chistykh Tarelok, and Tantsploshchadka.

 Awards and nominations 

 September 2008 — "GQ: Man of the Year" award — Winner in the category "Musician of the Year"
 December 2008 — Afisha magazine — Awarded best Russian-language album of the year («СБПЧ оркестр»)
 December 2011 — Time Out'' magazine includes the group's song "Zhivi khorosho!" in its list of "100 songs that changed our lives"
 June 2014 — "Afisha-Wave": Best album of the first half of the year — Third place in reader poll (14,000 votes)
 June 2014 — Steppenwolf award — Winner in the category "Album of the Year" («Я думаю, для этого еще не придумали слово»)
 August 2014  — "Snob. Made in Russia" award — Nomination "Music"
 September 2014 — "GQ: Man of the Year" award — Nomination in "Musician of the Year"
 November 2014 — Jagermeister Indie Awards 2014 — Winner in categories "Group of the Year" and "Single of the Year"
 December 2014 — Radio Follow Me — Award for "Group of the Year"

Discography

Studio albums 

 Самое большое простое число (2007)
 СБПЧ Оркестр (2008)
 Флешка (2011)
 Лесной оракул (2012)
 СБПЧ и Кассиопея поют песни друг друга (2013)
 Я думаю, для этого не придумали слово (2014)
 Здесь и всегда (2015)
 Мы — огромное животное, и мы вас всех съедим! (2016)
 Выброшу голову — пусть думает сердце! (2017) [EP]
 Мы не спали, мы снились (2018)
 Наверное, точно (2019)
 Все равно (2020)
 Со слов дерева записано верно (2021) [EP]
 Потерянное зеркальце (2021)
 Песни и музыка из сказки "Потерянное зеркальце" (2021)
 Ничего больше нет (2022)

Singles 

 Живи хорошо! (2010)
 Уменьшить себя, взявшись за угол (2011)
 СБПЧ 002 (2011)
 СБПЧ 003 (2011)
 Revoltmeter vs. СБПЧ (Самое большое простое число) & EU (Ёлочные игрушки) — Братское Сердце / White Heat (2011)
 Выходной (2014)
 Суперкит (2015)
 Люба (2016)
 Д-д-динозавр (2018)
Море (Privet Vesna Remix By The Lcd Drmrs) (2018)

Remix collections 

 Because You Don’t Know Russian (2014)

Music videos 

 Рождество (2008)
 Это (2009)
 Живи хорошо! (2009)
 Блокада (2010)
 Втроём (2013)
 Секрет (2013)
 Идеальное место (2013)
 Свадьба (2013)
 Выходной (2014)
 Нельзя сказать короче (2014)
 Взвешен (2014)
 Стамбул (2015)
 Сёстры (2015)
 Ответ (2015)
 Море (2015)
 Суперкит (2016)
 3 миллиарда ватт (2016)
 Люба (2016)
 Метеоры, кометы, болиды (2016)
 Sobaka (2017)
 Тайна (2017)
 Динозавр (2017)
 У нас есть всё (2018)
Африка (2018)
1999 / 17:05 / Друг (2018) (мини-фильм)
 Комната (2019)
Такси (2019)
Злой (2019)
Молодость (2019)

References

External links 

 Samoe Bolshoe Prostoe Chislo on VKontakte
 Samoe Bolshoe Prostoe Chislo on Facebook
 Samoe Bolshoe Prostoe Chislo on Bandcamp

Musical groups from Saint Petersburg
Musical groups established in 2007
Russian electronic music groups
Russian hip hop
Russian hip hop groups
Russian hip hop musicians
Russian musical groups
Rappers from Saint Petersburg